Coronation Street is a British soap opera created by writer Tony Warren. It was first broadcast on ITV on 9 December 1960. The following is a list of characters that first appeared in 1982, by order of first appearance.

Caroline Clegg

Caroline Clegg (née Wilson) is the wife of Gordon Clegg. Caroline and Gordon had met in 1982, and got engaged. Gordon introduced Caroline to his mother Betty Turpin. Betty took a shine to Caroline, although felt Gordon was rushing into things. Nevertherless, they got married later on, although it was a quick registry office affair and Betty was not told about it until after it happened. In 1985, their son Peter was born. In 1995, Caroline attended Betty's wedding to Billy Williams alongside Gordon and Peter. Seven years later in 2002, they attended the retirement party for Betty at the Rovers Return where she had been an employee since 1969. Caroline was not pleased when Gordon offered for Betty to come and stay with them in London. Betty moved in with them but soon felt isolated and unwanted. She left to return to her home in Weatherfield. When Betty died in 2012, Caroline did not attend the funeral with Gordon for unknown reasons.

Chalkie Whitely

Thomas "Chalkie" Whitely is a fictional character from the ITV soap opera Coronation Street, portrayed by actor Teddy Turner.

By 1982, Chalkie was a widower and living in Viaduct Street with his grandson Craig, who was living with him while his son Bob, a merchant seaman whose wife had also died, was at sea. Chalkie worked as binman alongside Eddie Yeats and Curly Watts, as a driver. When Chalkie got word that his home was to be demolished, he started house-hunting and became interested in 7 Coronation Street, recently rebuilt by Len Fairclough seventeen years after it collapsed in 1965. Len and his wife Rita lived next door at No.9 and were asking for £14,000 for the adjacent property, which Chalkie thought was too much. Rita also had her eye on the new house and tried to interest Chalkie in No.9, with the Faircloughs moving next door. Chalkie offered £10,000 - less than Len wanted but eventually Len was talked round, and in August Chalkie moved into the house with Craig. More disputes with the Faircloughs were to come; just before the Whitelys were to move in, Rita sold the house's carpets to Chalkie, only for them to be ruined when Len threw an impromptu farewell party at the house. When Chalkie forgot to pass on a letter to Len for a week, Len lost his temper and shouted at Chalkie, resulting in Chalkie refusing to pass on any of Len's post, costing his plumbing business work. Rita later settled it by paying to have Len's post redirected: a victory for Chalkie.

Looking after Craig was an arrangement which worked for Chalkie but it wasn't without difficulties. Craig was starting to become rebellious by skiving off school and playing his drums, annoying Chalkie and the neighbours, but worst of all was Craig's maternal grandmother Phyllis Pearce, who tracked the pair down even though Chalkie hadn't passed on their new address to her. Phyllis thought Chalkie was not meeting Craig's needs and started hanging around the house to keep an eye on them both (as Chalkie had feared). When Chalkie and Craig built a pigeon coop together, Phyllis released the pigeons as she thought they were dirty. Chalkie got the pigeons back and looked after them. In November, Bob returned from the Navy to a welcome home party thrown by Chalkie. To Chalkie's surprise, Bob wanted to leave the Navy and settle in Australia to raise Craig. Chalkie was also invited but although the prospect of being out of Phyllis's reach appealed to him, Chalkie had made a life in Weatherfield and felt too old to start again. Phyllis appealed to Chalkie to talk Bob into letting Craig stay but Chalkie decided against it, feeling that Craig would be better off in Australia with his father.

In January 1983, now living alone, Chalkie fell ill with flu and, against his will, was looked after by Phyllis. He kept in touch with the Whitelys in Australia as much as possible and in February decided to sell No.9 and live somewhere smaller so that he could give the money to Bob. Phyllis saw this as an opportunity to get her man and asked Chalkie to move in with her but unsurprisingly the idea didn't appeal to him. At the time, Chalkie was pursuing widow Alice Kirby and agreed to live with her, despite being somewhat frightened of Alice. He was ready to sell No.9 to Mr and Mrs Cheetham but Phyllis put them off buying the house, aware that losing that would mean losing any chance of Craig returning. Just as he was to move, Chalkie found out that Alice had dumped him for a retired all-in wrestler. In July, Chalkie put £10 on a five-horse accumulator and came up trumps with £3,554.75 winnings. He immediately started making plans to move to Australia by quitting his job and, leaving No.9 to be auctioned, left for Australia in August. Phyllis made a plea for Chalkie to take her with him but they were dutifully ignored.

Sharon Gaskell

Sharon Bentley (also Gaskell), played by Tracie Bennett, first appeared onscreen during the episode airing on 1 March 1982, and remained until her departure on 4 January 1984, later making a brief return in 1999. Sharon is introduced as a sixteen-year-old in foster care and is due to go to long-term foster parents, the Boltons. She is instead fostered by Len (Peter Adamson) and Rita Fairclough (Barbara Knox) in Weatherfield. She enjoys her stay initially, coming to see Len and Rita as parents, but she argues with Len at her 17th birthday party. After Len finds Sharon's boyfriend Steve Dunthorne (Howard Grace) trying to lead her upstairs, he forbids the pair from having sex. She decides to meet the Boltons, her other potential foster family, but decides that she prefers Len and Rita.

Sharon falls for Brian Tilsley (Christopher Quinten) and begins pursuing him, despite the fact he is married. Brian notices her interest, but remains faithful to Gail (Helen Worth) and although he did not encourage Sharon, he does not put her straight either, since he enjoys the attention. She begins babysitting for the couple, and on Brian's birthday, Sharon gives him a keyring, making Brian finally set her straight; however, she ignores him and steals a photograph. Gail sees them fighting over this, and dismisses Sharon's feelings as a teenage crush and asks Rita to have a word with her. Sharon claims that she and Brian are in love, and that Brian had initiated it. Later that year, she begins working as a kennel maid in Sheffield, living with the Stringer family. Len offers her an apprenticeship at the yard so she could stay in Weatherfield but Sharon refuses, feeling she needs a new start.

Sharon returns after hearing about Len's death in a road accident. There, she catches Curly Watts' (Kevin Kennedy) eye. She is embarrassed when Curly reads out a poem about his feelings for her, but agrees to go out with him. On their date, they meet Terry Duckworth (Nigel Pivaro), and Sharon ditches Curly to go to a UB40 concert with Terry. Sharon returns to Sheffield the next day.

Fifteen years later, Sharon returns to Weatherfield to invite Rita to her wedding. She is engaged to Ian Bentley (Jonathan Guy Lewis), a sales representative, and Rita persuades Sharon to get married in Weatherfield. Sharon makes friends with Sally Webster (Sally Dynevor), who like Sharon, has a close relationship with Rita. Ian begins an affair with the recently widowed Natalie Barnes (Denise Welch). Sharon discovers the affair, but intends to marry Ian regardless, dismissing the affair as one last fling. However, during the service, Sharon calls Ian a liar and jilts him. Happy that Sharon has decided to stay, Rita offers her a job at the Kabin and Alec Gilroy's (Roy Barraclough) old flat, No.12. Sharon happily accepts, despite clashing with Rita's assistant, Leanne Battersby (Jane Danson). Rita gives the Kabin to Sharon for her 34th birthday.

Soon afterwards, Sharon begins dating Danny Hargreaves (Richard Standing), but it ends when Danny realises that he is in love with Sally. A depressed Sharon attempts suicide, but cannot go through with it. After her suicide bid, she gets in touch with Ian, and the pair rekindle their relationship, as they realise they still love each other. Rita is furious when Sharon announces her plan to marry Ian and sell the Kabin, so that she could buy a house in Bolton. Rita buys the Kabin from Sharon and tells her not to expect anything else from her. Sharon marries Ian and leaves Weatherfield.

In March 2021, it was announced that Bennett would be reprising her role as Sharon. On her return, she commented: "I am absolutely thrilled to be returning to the cobbles. It is a dream come true for me. I had such an amazing time there, and I am looking forward to working with Barbara again and getting my teeth into the storylines they have planned for Sharon." She was initially approached by producers 18 months prior to her return, but due to her work schedule and the impact of the COVID–19 pandemic on television, it meant that her return date was pushed back. She finally made her return on the April 21, 2021 episode, reuniting with Rita, and informing her of her past battles with cancer and her breakup with Ian. After scrutiny and suspicion from Jenny Connor (Sally Ann Matthews), she once again leaves after giving Rita a cheque for £10,000. She returns again on the 23 April episode, where she patches things up with Jenny and after breaking down and telling Rita and Jenny of her loneliness, Rita agrees to let her move back in with her. She questions various people about the whereabouts of Leanne Battersby (Jane Danson) and when she goes to visit drug lord Harvey Gaskell (Will Mellor) in prison, it is revealed that she is his aunt. Over the following weeks she tries to find the location of Simon, Leanne and Nick, befriending Nick's son Sam Blakeman (Jude Riordan) and using him to inform Simon that his dad has been sent to hospital for a liver transplant. When Simon arrives at the hospital, his father Peter (Chris Gascoyne) saves him from being abducted and is attacked. Simon leaves his address with Peter, but Sharon finds it on Carla's phone, only to find that the flat is empty. She makes several further attempts to track down Simon, and Harvey insists she resort to intimidating Sam. Harvey arranges Sam's kidnapping. Nick returns to the street, but is warned by Harvey that, if Simon and Leanne give evidence against him, he will harm Sam. Jenny’s husband Johnny recognizes Sharon, having seen her visiting Harvey. When Jenny confronts her, Sharon uses a Taser, and then tries to flee but is interrupted by Rita who locks them both in The Kabin before Gary Windass (Mikey North) breaks in. Seeing Sharon in the white van that Sam was kidnapped in, Gary steals the keys and is pursued by the armed driver, whose attempt to shoot at them is foiled by Sam.

Wayne Gaskell

Wayne Gaskell is the brother of Sharon Gaskell (Tracie Bennett). He arrives at Sharon's 17th birthday party at her foster parents Len (Peter Adamson) and Rita Fairclough's (Barbara Knox) home unannounced and causes trouble by making unwanted advances towards Trish Keegan (Debbie Bowers) and picks a fight with Steve Dunthorne (Howard Grace) after Steve confronts him about his behaviour toward Trish. Sharon goes to get Len from the Rovers Return, who then throws Wayne out and he is not seen again. In 2021, it emerges that Wayne has since died and Sharon has inherited his estate. Sharon visits Wayne's son, Harvey Gaskell (Will Mellor) in prison.

Raymond Attwood
Raymond Attwood is a teenager whose spending attracts the suspicions of Deirdre Barlow (Anne Kirkbride) who informs her husband Ken but he refuses to contact the police. The following week, the police arrest Raymond for Betty Turpin's (Betty Driver) mugging.

Ted Farrell

Ted Farrell is Betty Turpin's wartime sweetheart who fathered her son Gordon Clegg. Ted reads about Betty's recent mugging in the local paper and visits her in hospital. It transpires that Ted has settled in Portsmouth, married and fathered a daughter. Betty decides not to tell him the truth about Gordon, not wanting to drag up the past. Ted leaves after he and Betty agree to remember each other as just sweethearts.

Craig Whitely

Craig Whitely was a fictional character in the British soap opera Coronation Street, played by Mark Price.

Craig was living with Chalkie while his dad Bob, a merchant seaman, was at sea. In moving to No.9 from their house in Viaduct Street, Chalkie hoped to escape from Phyllis Pearce, Craig's maternal grandmother, who doted on Craig and also had her eye on Chalkie. On moving in, Craig upset the neighbours with his drums, which annoyed even Chalkie. Craig wanted to start a band and skived off school with his friends. Within a few weeks, Phyllis tracked her errant relations down and tried to convince Chalkie to let Craig move in with her, telling him that No.9 was a tip and not fit for a growing lad to live in. When Chalkie and Craig built a pigeon coop together, Phyllis released the pigeons as she thought they were dirty. Chalkie got the pigeons back and looked after them.

In November, Bob returned ashore and announced he was leaving the Navy and emigrating to Australia with Craig. Craig didn't think much of the prospect but came round to the idea when Bob invited Chalkie to come along if he could afford it. Chalkie felt too old to make a new start and joined forces with Phyllis to persuade Bob to keep things as they were, but Bob wanted to make up for his absences from Craig's life to date and Chalkie, realising Craig would have better opportunities in Australia, convinced him to go. The following year, Chalkie won on a five-horse accumulator and moved to Australia to settle with the family after all.

Phyllis Pearce

Phyllis Pearce (née Grimes) was a fictional character in the British soap opera Coronation Street, played by Jill Summers. Phyllis arrived in 1982, originally touted as a new Ena Sharples, she was seen interfering in the life of grandson Craig who lived with his grandad Chalkie Whitely at Number 9.

In September 1982 Phyllis tracked down her grandson, Craig Whitely, to Coronation Street. As he was her only surviving family; her daughter Margaret had died of cancer in 1977. Phyllis wanted him to come and live with her. However, Craig refused by choosing instead to continue living with his paternal grandfather Chalkie Whitely at No.9. Phyllis stayed in Weatherfield to be near Craig but was stunned when Bob Whitely, Craig's father, returned in November to announce that he had left the Navy and was emigrating to Australia, taking Craig with him. Following Craig's departure in December, Phyllis turned her attentions towards Chalkie - looking after him when he came down with flu. When Phyllis found out at the beginning of the year that her house on Omdurman Street was to be demolished, she hoped to move in with Chalkie but he turned her down as he hoped to sell the house as Bob needed the money. Fearing that if he did sell up he would move to Australia and would never see Craig again, Phyllis did all that she could to prevent it from happening. Phyllis' plans were thwarted when Chalkie won £3,543.75 at the bookies and he finally sold No.9 before leaving for Australia at the beginning of August 1983.

In August 1984, Phyllis was employed by Gail Tilsley as a washer-upper at Jim's Cafe. Phyllis eventually got over Chalkie's departure and set her sights on Percy Sugden, the Community Centre's caretaker. Phyllis doggedly pursued Percy over the following years, chasing him at the Valentine's ball and looking after him while he was ill. 
In September 1985, Phyllis was wooed by Sam Tindall (Tom Mennard), Percy's bowls rival, but she was not interested until she realised Percy was in the tournament too. She then offered herself up as a prize to the winner of the tournament. However, when Percy won he refused to take her on the Bowls trip to Southport with him - claiming there were no tickets left. Phyllis managed to obtain a ticket and join Percy, Sam and the bowls team on their trip and she and Percy ended up missing the coach back. When Emily Bishop invited Phyllis for Christmas dinner she accepted but asked that Emily keep it secret from Percy. Much to Emily's surprise, Phyllis and Percy appeared to get on well come Christmas Day.

In 1993, she won a poetry competition for a poem about her love for Percy, and in January 1996, her hopes rocketed as Maud Grimes read Phyllis' tea leaves and told her the man of her dreams was coming into her life. However, Maud had mixed up the cups. There was one other man in Phyllis' life - Des Barnes. Des took pity on Phyllis when she lost her café job and let her become housekeeper at 6 Coronation Street. Although Phyllis had seen plenty of Des' philanderings, she had always been discreet, though at times she had to turn a blind eye or give Des a good talking-to.

Phyllis later moved to the retirement complex, Mayfield Court. She was last seen in 1996 and has not been mentioned since. Actress Jill Summers died in 1997 and it is to be assumed that the character of Phyllis died with her.

Bob Whitely

Robert "Bob" Whitely was the son of Chalkie Whitely and father of Craig, a merchant seaman who, after his wife Margaret died, left his son with his father whilst he was at sea. In November 1982, he decided he had enough of the sea and decided to settle down, in Australia, and he took Craig with him. Chalkie followed the next year, after winning a bet on the horses.

During his brief stay with his father, Bob caught the eye of barmaid Bet Lynch, but he only settled for her when he discovered that his preferred option, Deirdre Barlow, was married. However, Bob and Bet's date consisted of them, watching television alongside Bob's family - Chalkie, Craig and Phyllis Pearce.

References

1982
, Coronation Street
Coronation Street